are medals awarded by the Emperor of Japan. They are awarded to individuals who have done meritorious deeds and also to those who have achieved excellence in their field of work. The Medals of Honor were established on December 7, 1881, and were first awarded the following year. Several expansions and amendments have been made since then. The medal design for all six types are the same, bearing the stylized characters  on a gilt central disc surrounded by a silver ring of cherry blossoms on the obverse; only the colors of the ribbon differ.

If for some reason an individual were to receive a second medal of the same ribbon colour, then a second medal is not issued but rather a new bar is added to their current medal. The Medals of Honor are awarded twice each year, on April 29 (the birthday of the Shōwa Emperor) and November 3 (the birthday of the Meiji Emperor).

Types

Red ribbon
First awarded in 1882. Awarded to individuals who have risked their own lives to save the lives of others.

Green ribbon
First awarded in 1882. Originally awarded "to children, grandchildren, wives and servants for remarkable acts of piety; and to individuals who, through their diligence and perseverance while engaging in their professional activities, became public role models".

Changed social values after World War II had resulted in the conferment of this medal being suspended after 1950; since 1955 it has been replaced to some extent by the revived Medal with Yellow Ribbon (see below). However, in 2003 the Medal with Green Ribbon was revived as an award to morally remarkable individuals who have actively taken part in serving society.

Yellow ribbon
First awarded in 1887 (later abolished); revived in 1955. Awarded to individuals who, through their diligence and perseverance while engaging in their professional activities, became public role models.

Purple ribbon

First awarded in 1955. Awarded to individuals who have contributed to academic and artistic developments, improvements and accomplishments.

Blue ribbon
First awarded in 1882. Awarded to individuals who have made significant achievements in the areas of public welfare or public service.

Dark blue ribbon
First awarded in 1919. Awarded to individuals who have made exceptionally generous financial contributions for the well-being of the public.

Select recipients

Red
Samuel Robinson
 Yan Jun, a People's Republic of China citizen who saved a Japanese child in September 2013
 Anuj Raj Karki, a Nepalese citizen who saved a Japanese girl lying unconscious on a railway track.

Green

 Ryōtarō Sugi

 Torakusu Yamaha

Yellow
Ken Ono
Hiroshi Maeda
 Noguchi Naohiko
 Hiroshi Tsukakoshi
 Hisashi Suzuki
Mitsugu Shibata

Purple

 Osamu Akimoto
 Yasushi Akimoto
 Toshiko Akiyoshi
 Hideaki Anno
 Shizuka Arakawa
 Chieko Asakawa
 Kinji Fukasaku
 Moto Hagio
 Yuzuru Hanyu
 Machiko Hasegawa
Joe Hisaishi
Sayuri Ishikawa
Chika Kuroda
 Keisuke Kuwata
 Akihiro Maeta
Takashi Matsumoto
Miyuki Nakajima
Eiichi Nakamura
 Koichi Nakano
 Hitoshi Narita
Tetsuya Noda
Hideyuki Okano
 Katsuhiro Otomo
 Shoichi Ozawa
Takao Saito
Hiroyuki Sasaki
Takashi Shimura
Yasuharu Suematsu
Taihō Kōki
 Rumiko Takahashi
 Keiko Takemiya
 
Mitsuo Tsukahara
Tsuyoshi Tsutsumi
 Morihei Ueshiba
Hozan Yamamoto
Yoshihisa Yamamoto
 Koji Yamamura
 Kono Yasui
 Akinori Yonezawa
 Masaaki Yuasa
Toshiko Yuasa
Kōji Yakusho
Katsuya Yokoyama

Blue
 Clara Converse awarded 1929 for contributions to women's education.
 Tano Jōdai awarded for contributions to women's education
 Rokuro Ishikawa
 Koichi Kawai 
 Yasuhiro Fukushima
 Yanosuke Hirai, Nuclear engineer whose precaution and foresight prevented two nuclear disasters.
 Masaru Ibuka
 Kaoru Inoue
 Kazuo Imai
 Keiichi Ishizaka
 Norio Ohga
 Eishiro Saito
 Hiroko Sakai
 Nobuchika Sugimura
 Shoichiro Toyoda
 Yoshikazu Yahiro
 Gōgen Yamaguchi
 Alice Appenzeller
Magokichi Yamaoka
 Carlos Ghosn
 Toshiko Satake (Satake Corporation)
 Abbas Kiarostami
 Hiroyuki Ito (Crypton Future Media)
 Miyazaki Atsuo
 Tomio Fukuoka (1993)
 Tokio Yokoi, Rev ordained minister and politician, international author 1890 to 1920. IHJ 3rd Class Honour award for his contributions during the 1919 Paris Peace Talks
 Tsuyoshi Kikukawa 
Kisshomaru Ueshiba 
Moriteru Ueshiba

Dark blue
Ayumi Hamasaki
Shingo Katori
Tak Matsumoto
Masahiro Nakai
Takahiro Nishijima
Yoshiki

References

Bibliography
 Peterson, James W., Barry C. Weaver and Michael A. Quigley. (2001). Orders and Medals of Japan and Associated States. San Ramon, California: Orders and Medals Society of America.

External links
 Japan, Cabinet Office: Decorations and Medals
 Decoration Bureau: Medals of Honour
 Japan Mint: Production Process

Awards established in 1881
1881 establishments in Japan

Ribbon symbolism